"The Twelve Days of Christmas" is an English Christmas carol. A classic example of a cumulative song, the lyrics detail a series of increasingly numerous gifts given on each of the twelve days of Christmas (the twelve days that make up the Christmas season, starting with Christmas Day). The carol, whose words were first published in England in the late eighteenth century, has a Roud Folk Song Index number of 68.  A large number of different melodies have been associated with the song, of which the best known is derived from a 1909 arrangement of a traditional folk melody by English composer Frederic Austin.

Lyrics 

"The Twelve Days of Christmas" is a cumulative song, meaning that each verse is built on top of the previous verses. There are twelve verses, each describing a gift given by "my true love" on one of the twelve days of Christmas.
There are many variations in the lyrics. The lyrics given here are from Frederic Austin's 1909 publication that established the current form of the carol. The first three verses run, in full, as follows:

Subsequent verses follow the same pattern. Each verse deals with the next day of Christmastide, adding one new gift and then repeating all the earlier gifts, so that each verse is one line longer than its predecessor.
 four calling birds
 five gold rings
 six geese a-laying
 seven swans a-swimming
 eight maids a-milking
 nine ladies dancing
 ten lords a-leaping
 eleven pipers piping
 twelve drummers drumming

Variations of the lyrics 

The earliest known publications of the words to The Twelve Days of Christmas were an illustrated children's book, Mirth Without Mischief, published in London in 1780, and a  broadsheet by Angus, of Newcastle, dated to the late eighteenth or early nineteenth centuries.

While the words as published in Mirth without Mischief and the Angus broadsheet were almost identical, subsequent versions (beginning with James Orchard Halliwell's Nursery Rhymes of England of 1842) have displayed considerable variation:

 In the earliest versions, the word on is not present at the beginning of each verse—for example, the first verse begins simply "The first day of Christmas".  On was added in Austin's 1909 version, and became very popular thereafter.
 In the early versions "my true love sent" me the gifts. However, a 20th-century variant has "my true love gave to me"; this wording has become particularly common in North America.
 In one 19th-century variant, the gifts come from "my mother" rather than "my true love".
 Some variants have "juniper tree" or "June apple tree" rather than "pear tree", presumably a mishearing of "partridge in a pear tree".
 The 1780 version has "four colly birds"—colly being a regional English expression for "coal-black" (the name of the collie dog breed may come from this word).  This wording must have been opaque to many even in the 19th century: "canary birds", "colour'd birds", "curley birds", and "corley birds" are found in its place.  Frederic Austin's 1909 version, which introduced the now-standard melody, also altered the fourth day's gift to four "calling" birds, and this variant has become the most popular, although "colly" is still found.
 "Five gold rings" has often become "five golden rings", especially in North America. In the standard melody, this change enables singers to fit one syllable per musical note.
 The gifts associated with the final four days are often reordered.  For example, the pipers may be on the ninth day rather than the eleventh.

For ease of comparison with Austin's 1909 version given above:
(a) differences in wording, ignoring capitalisation and punctuation, are indicated in italics (including permutations, where for example the 10th day of Austin's version becomes the 9th day here);
(b) items that do not appear at all in Austin's version are indicated in bold italics.

Scotland 
A similar cumulative verse from Scotland, "The Yule Days", has been likened to "The Twelve Days of Christmas" in the scholarly literature. It has thirteen days rather than twelve, and the number of gifts does not increase in the manner of "The Twelve Days".  Its final verse, as published in Chambers, Popular Rhymes, Fireside Stories, and Amusements of Scotland (1842), runs as follows:

"Pippin go aye" (also spelled "papingo-aye" in later editions) is a Scots word for peacock or parrot.

Similarly, Iceland has a Christmas tradition where "Yule Lads" put gifts in the shoes of children for each of the 13 nights of Christmas.

Faroe Islands 

In the Faroe Islands, there is a comparable counting Christmas song. The gifts include: one feather, two geese, three sides of meat, four sheep, five cows, six oxen, seven dishes, eight ponies, nine banners, ten barrels, eleven goats, twelve men, thirteen hides, fourteen rounds of cheese and fifteen deer. These were illustrated in 1994 by local cartoonist Óli Petersen (born 1936) on a series of two stamps issued by the Faroese Philatelic Office.

Sweden 
In Blekinge and Småland, southern Sweden, a similar song was also sung. It featured one hen, two barley seeds, three grey geese, four pounds of pork, six flayed sheep, a sow with six pigs, seven åtting grain, eight grey foals with golden saddles, nine newly born cows, ten pairs of oxen, eleven clocks, and finally twelve churches, each with twelve altars, each with twelve priests, each with twelve capes, each with twelve coin-purses, each with twelve daler inside.

France 
"Les Douze Mois" ("The Twelve Months") (also known as "La Perdriole"—"The Partridge") is another similar cumulative verse from France that has been likened to The Twelve Days of Christmas. Its final verse, as published in de Coussemaker, Chants Populaires des Flamands de France (1856), runs as follows:

According to de Coussemaker, the song was recorded "in the part of [French] Flanders that borders on the Pas de Calais".
Another similar folksong, "Les Dons de l'An", was recorded in the Cambresis region of France.  Its final verse, as published in 1864, runs:

History and meaning

Origins
The exact origins and the meaning of the song are unknown, but it is highly probable that it originated from a children's memory and forfeit game.

The twelve days in the song are the twelve days starting with Christmas Day to the day before Epiphany (5 January). Twelfth Night is defined by the Oxford English Dictionary as "the evening of January 5th, the day before Epiphany, which traditionally marks the end of Christmas celebrations".

The best known English version was first printed in Mirth without Mischief, a children's book published in London around 1780. The work was heavily illustrated with woodcuts, attributed in one source to Thomas Bewick.

In the northern counties of England, the song was often called the "Ten Days of Christmas", as there were only ten gifts. It was also known in Somerset, Dorset, and elsewhere in England. The kinds of gifts vary in a number of the versions, some of them becoming alliterative tongue-twisters. "The Twelve Days of Christmas" was also widely popular in the United States and Canada. It is mentioned in the section on "Chain Songs" in Stith Thompson's Motif-Index of Folk-Literature (Indiana University Studies, Vol. 5, 1935), p. 416.

There is evidence pointing to the North of England, specifically the area around Newcastle upon Tyne, as the origin of the carol. Husk, in the 1864 excerpt quoted below, stated that the carol was "found on broadsides printed at Newcastle at various periods during the last hundred and fifty years", i.e. from approximately 1714. In addition, many of the nineteenth century citations come from the Newcastle area.
Peter and Iona Opie suggest that "if '[t]he partridge in the peartree' is to be taken literally it looks as if the chant comes from France, since the Red Leg partridge, which perches in trees more frequently than the common partridge, was not successfully introduced into England until about 1770".

Some authors suggest a connection to a religious verse entitled "Twelfth Day", found in a thirteenth century manuscript at Trinity College, Cambridge; this theory is criticised as "erroneous" by Yoffie.  It has also been suggested that this carol is connected to the "old ballad" which Sir Toby Belch begins to sing in Shakespeare's Twelfth Night.

Manner of performance
Many early sources suggest that The Twelve Days of Christmas was a "memory-and-forfeits" game, in which participants were required to repeat a verse of poetry recited by the leader. Players who made an error were required to pay a penalty, in the form of offering a kiss or confection.

Halliwell, writing in 1842, stated that "[e]ach child in succession repeats the gifts of the day, and forfeits for each mistake."

Salmon, writing from Newcastle, claimed in 1855 that the song "[had] been, up to within twenty years, extremely popular as a schoolboy's Christmas chant".

Husk, writing in 1864, stated: 

Thomas Hughes, in a short story published in 1864, described a fictional game of Forfeits involving the song:

Barnes (1882), stated that the last verse "is to be said in one breath".

Scott (1892), reminiscing about Christmas and New Year's celebrations in Newcastle around the year 1844, described a performance thus:

Lady Gomme wrote in 1898:

Meanings of the gifts

Partridge in a pear tree
An anonymous "antiquarian", writing in 1867, speculated that "pear-tree" is a corruption of French perdrix ("partridge").  This was also suggested by Anne Gilchrist, who observed in 1916 that "from the constancy in English, French, and Languedoc versions of the 'merry little partridge,' I suspect that 'pear-tree' is really perdrix (Old French pertriz) carried into England".  The variant text "part of a juniper tree", found as early as c. 1840, is likely not original, since "partridge" is found in the French versions. It is probably a corruption of "partridge in a pear tree", though Gilchrist suggests "juniper tree" could have been joli perdrix, [pretty partridge].

Another suggestion is that an old English drinking song may have furnished the idea for the first gift. William B. Sandys refers to it as a "convivial glee introduced a few years since, 'A Pie [i.e., a magpie] sat on a Pear Tree,' where one drinks while the others sing." The image of the bird in the pear tree also appears in lines from a children's counting rhyme an old Mother Goose.

 A pye sate on a pear tree, Heigh O
 Once so merrily hopp'd she; Heigh O
 Twice so merrily, etc.
 Thrice so, etc.

French hens
Gilchrist suggests that the adjective "French" may mean "foreign".  Sharp reports that one singer sings "Britten chains", which he interprets as a corruption of "Breton hens".   William and Ceil Baring-Gould also suggest that the birds are Breton hens, which they see as another indication that the carol is of French origin.

Colly birds
The word "colly", found in the earliest publications, was the source of considerable confusion.   Multiple sources confirm that it is a dialectal word, found in Somerset and elsewhere, meaning "black", so "colly birds" are blackbirds.  Despite this, other theories about the word's origin are also found in the literature, such as that the word is a corruption of French collet ("ruff"), or of "coloured".

Gold rings

Shahn suggests that "the five golden rings refer to the ringed pheasant".  William and Ceil Baring-Gould reiterate this idea, which implies that the gifts for first seven days are all birds. Others suggest the gold rings refer to "five goldspinks"—a goldspink being an old name for a goldfinch; or even canaries. However, the 1780 publication includes an illustration that clearly depicts the "five gold rings" as being jewellery.

General

According to The Oxford Dictionary of Nursery Rhymes, "Suggestions have been made that the gifts have significance, as representing the food or sport for each month of the year. Importance [certainly has] long been attached to the Twelve Days, when, for instance, the weather on each day was carefully observed to see what it would be in the corresponding month of the coming year. Nevertheless, whatever the ultimate origin of the chant, it seems probable [that] the lines that survive today both in England and France are merely an irreligious travesty."
In 1979, a Canadian hymnologist, Hugh D. McKellar, published an article, "How to Decode the Twelve Days of Christmas", in which he suggested that "The Twelve Days of Christmas" lyrics were intended as a catechism song to help young English Catholics learn their faith, at a time when practising Catholicism was against the law (from 1558 until 1829). McKellar offered no evidence for his claim. Three years later, in 1982, Fr. Hal Stockert wrote an article (subsequently posted on-line in 1995) in which he suggested a similar possible use of the twelve gifts as part of a catechism. The possibility that the twelve gifts were used as a catechism during the period of Catholic repression was also hypothesised in this same time period (1987 and 1992) by Fr. James Gilhooley, chaplain of Mount Saint Mary College of Newburgh, New York. Snopes.com, a website reviewing urban legends, Internet rumours, e-mail forwards, and other stories of unknown or questionable origin, concludes that the hypothesis of the twelve gifts of Christmas being a surreptitious Catholic catechism is incorrect. None of the enumerated items would distinguish Catholics from Protestants, and so would hardly need to be secretly encoded.

Music

Standard melody 

The now-standard melody for the carol was popularised by the English baritone and composer Frederic Austin.  The singer, having arranged the music for solo voice with piano accompaniment, included it in his concert repertoire from 1905 onwards.   A Times review from 1906 praised the "quaint folk-song", while noting that "the words ... are better known than the excellent if intricate tune".

Austin's arrangement was published by Novello & Co. in 1909.  According to a footnote added to the posthumous 1955 reprint of his musical setting, Austin wrote: 

A number of later publications state that Austin's music for "five gold rings" is an original addition to an otherwise traditional melody.  An early appearance of this claim is found in the 1961 University Carol Book, which states:  Similar statements are found in John Rutter's 1967 arrangement, and in the 1992 New Oxford Book of Carols.

Many of the decisions Austin made with regard to the lyrics subsequently became widespread:
 The initial "On" at the beginning of each verse.
 The use of "calling birds", rather than "colly birds", on the fourth day.
 The ordering of the ninth to twelfth verses.
The time signature of this song is not constant, unlike most popular music. This irregular meter perhaps reflects the song's folk origin. The introductory lines "On the [nth] day of Christmas, my true love gave to me", are made up of two  bars, while most of the lines naming gifts receive one  bar per gift with the exception of "Five gold rings", which receives two  bars, "Two turtle doves" getting a  bar with "And a" on its fourth beat and "partridge in a pear tree" getting two  bars of music. In most versions, a  bar of music immediately follows "partridge in a pear tree". "On the" is found in that bar on the fourth (pickup) beat for the next verse.  The successive bars of three for the gifts surrounded by bars of four give the song its hallmark "hurried" quality.

The second to fourth verses' melody is different from that of the fifth to twelfth verses. Before the fifth verse (when "Five gold rings" is first sung), the melody, using solfege, is "sol re mi fa re" for the fourth to second items, and this same melody is thereafter sung for the twelfth to sixth items. However, the melody for "four colly birds, three French hens, two turtle doves" changes from this point, differing from the way these lines were sung in the opening four verses.

In the final verse, Austin inserted a flourish on the words "Five gold rings".  This has not been copied by later versions, which simply repeat the melody from the earlier verses.

Earlier melodies 

The earliest known sources for the text, such as Mirth Without Mischief, do not include music.

A melody, possibly related to the "traditional" melody on which Austin based his arrangement, was recorded in Providence, Rhode Island in 1870 and published in 1905.
Cecil Sharp's Folk Songs from Somerset (1905) contains two different melodies for the song, both distinct from the now-standard melody.

Several folklorists have recorded the carol using traditional melodies. Peter Kennedy recorded the Copper family of Sussex, England singing a version in 1955 which differs slightly from the common version, whilst Helen Hartness Flanders recorded several different versions in the 1930s and 40s in New England, where the song seems to have been particularly popular. Edith Fowke recorded a single version sung by Woody Lambe of Toronto, Canada in 1963, whilst Herbert Halpert recorded one version sung by Oscar Hampton and Sabra Bare in Morgantown, North Carolina  One interesting version was also recorded in 1962 in Deer, Arkansas, performed by Sara Stone; the recording is available online courtesy of the University of Arkansas.

Parodies and other versions 
 

 Bing Crosby and the Andrews Sisters recorded the traditional version of this song on 10 May 1949 for Decca Records.
 The Ray Conniff Singers recorded a traditional version in 1962, appearing on the album We Wish You a Merry Christmas.
 Jasper Carrott performed "Twelve Drinks of Christmas" where he appears to be more inebriated with each successive verse. This was based on Scottish comedian Bill Barclay's version.
 Perry Como recorded a traditional version of "Twelve Days of Christmas" for RCA Victor in 1953, but varied the lyrics with "11 Lords a Leaping", "10 Ladies Dancing", and "9 Pipers Piping". The orchestrations were done by Mitchell Ayres.
 Allan Sherman released two different versions of "The Twelve Gifts of Christmas". Sherman wrote and performed his version of the classic Christmas carol on a 1963 TV special that was taped well in advance of the holiday. Warner Bros. Records rushed out a 45 RPM version in early December.
 Alvin and the Chipmunks covered the song for their 1963 album Christmas with The Chipmunks, Vol. 2.
 The illustrator Hilary Knight included A Firefly in a Fir Tree in his Christmas Nutshell Library, a boxed set of four miniature holiday-themed books published in 1963. In this rendition, the narrator is a mouse, with the various gifts reduced to mouse scale, such as "nine nuts for nibbling" and "four holly berries". Later released separately with the subtitle A Carol for Mice.
 Frank Sinatra and his children, Frank Sinatra Jr., Nancy Sinatra, and Tina Sinatra, included their own version of "The Twelve Days of Christmas" on their 1968 album, The Sinatra Family Wish You a Merry Christmas.
 Sears put out a special Christmas coloring book with Disney's Winnie-the-Pooh characters in 1973 featuring a version of the carol focusing on Pooh's attempts to get a pot of honey from a hollow honey tree, with each verse ending in "and a hunny pot inna hollow tree".
 Fay McKay, an American musical comedian, is best known for "The Twelve Daze of Christmas", a parody in which the gifts were replaced with various alcoholic drinks, resulting in her performance becoming increasingly inebriated over the course of the song.
 A radio play written by Brian Sibley, "And Yet Another Partridge in a Pear Tree" was broadcast on BBC Radio 4 on Christmas Day 1977. Starring Penelope Keith, it imagines the increasingly exasperated response of the recipient of the "twelve days" gifts. It was rebroadcast in 2011.
 The Muppets and singer-songwriter John Denver performed "The Twelve Days of Christmas" on the 1979 television special John Denver and the Muppets: A Christmas Together. It was featured on the album of the same name. The song has been recorded by the Muppets five different times, featuring different Muppets in different roles each time.
 A Māori / New Zealand version, titled "A Pūkeko in a Ponga Tree", written by Kingi Matutaera Ihaka, appeared as a picture book and cassette recording in 1981.
 On the late-night sketch-comedy program Second City TV in 1982, the Canadian-rustic characters Bob & Doug McKenzie (Rick Moranis and Dave Thomas) released a version on the SCTV spin-off album Great White North.
 The Twelve Days of Christmas (TV 1993), an animated tale which aired on NBC, features the voices of Marcia Savella, Larry Kenney, Carter Cathcart, Donna Vivino and Phil Hartman.
 VeggieTales parodied "The Twelve Days of Christmas" under the title "The 8 Polish Foods of Christmas" in the 1996 album A Very Veggie Christmas. It was later rerecorded as a Silly Song for the episode The Little Drummer Boy in 2011.
 Christian rock band Relient K released a recording of the song on their 2007 album Let It Snow, Baby... Let It Reindeer. This version known for its slightly satirical refrain: "What's a partridge? What's a pear tree? I don't know, so please don't ask me. But I can bet those are terrible gifts to get."
 A program hosted by Tom Arnold, The 12 Days of Redneck Christmas, which takes a look at Christmas traditions, premiered on CMT in 2008. The theme music is "The Twelve Days of Christmas".
 Shannon Chan-Kent, as her character of Pinkie Pie from My Little Pony: Friendship Is Magic, sings her own version of the song on the album My Little Pony: It's a Pony Kind of Christmas.
 Irish actor Frank Kelly recorded "Christmas Countdown" in 1982 in which a man named Gobnait O'Lúnasa receives the 12 Christmas gifts referenced in the song from a lady named Nuala. As each gift is received, Gobnait gets increasingly upset with the person who sent them, as said gifts wreak havoc in the house where he lives with his mother. This version charted in both Ireland (where it reached number 8 in 1982) and the UK (entering the UK chart in December 1983 and reaching number 26). The song peaked at number 15 in Australia in 1984.
 A special Creature Comforts orchestral arrangement of "The Twelve Days of Christmas" was made by British animator Nick Park and Aardman Animations. Featuring different animals discussing or trying to remember the lyrics of the song, it was released on Christmas Day 2005.
 New Orleans band Benny Grunch and the Bunch perform a "locals-humor take" on the song, titled "The Twelve Yats of Christmas".
 The video game StarCraft: Broodwar released a new map named Twelve Days of StarCraft with the song which was adopted a new lyric featured units from the game by Blizzard on 23 December 1999. In 2013, CarbotAnimations created a new web animation, StarCraft's Christmas Special 2013 the Twelve Days of StarCrafts, with the song which was played in the map Twelve Days of Starcraft.
 In Hawaii, The Twelve Days of Christmas, Hawaiian Style, with the words by Eaton Bob Magoon Jr., Edward Kenny, and Gordon N. Phelps, is popular. It is typically sung by children in concerts with proper gesticulation.
 A version by Crayola was made in 2008 titled The 64 Days of Crayola.
 American rock and roll radio on-air personality Bob Rivers made a version of the song, The Twelve Pains of Christmas (from Twisted Christmas, 1988), replacing the traditional gifts with a list of hassles associated with Christmas, such as installing decorative lighting, or going shopping for gifts.
 In the 12 Disasters of Christmas movie, the song has actually been created by the Mayas to ensure that a prophecy of the end of the world be foretold among europeans even after the destruction of the Mayas' civilization.

Christmas Price Index 

Since 1984, the cumulative costs of the items mentioned in the song have been used as a tongue-in-cheek economic indicator. Assuming the gifts are repeated in full in each round of the song, then a total of 364 items are delivered by the twelfth day. This custom began with and is maintained by PNC Bank. Two pricing charts are created, referred to as the Christmas Price Index and The True Cost of Christmas. The former is an index of the current costs of one set of each of the gifts given by the True Love to the singer of the song "The Twelve Days of Christmas". The latter is the cumulative cost of all the gifts with the repetitions listed in the song. The people mentioned in the song are hired, not purchased. The total costs of all goods and services for the 2015 Christmas Price Index is US$34,130.99, or $155,407.18 for all 364 items. The original 1984 cost was $12,623.10. The index has been humorously criticised for not accurately reflecting the true cost of the gifts featured in the Christmas carol.

John Julius Norwich's 1998 book, The Twelve Days of Christmas (Correspondence), uses the motif of repeating the previous gifts on each subsequent day, to humorous effect.

Computational complexity 

Incidentally, it is also observed that the total number of gifts after  days equals .

In 1988, a C program authored by Ian Phililipps won the International Obfuscated C Code Contest. The code, which according to the jury of the contest "looked like what you would get by pounding on the keys of an old typewriter at random", takes advantage of the recursive structure of the song to print its lyrics with code that is shorter than the lyrics themselves.

Notes

References

Footnotes

Bibliography 
 
 
 
 
 
 
 Opie, Peter and Iona, eds. The Oxford Dictionary of Nursery Rhymes. Oxford: Oxford University Press, 1951, pp. 122–230, .

External links 

 
  Free online simple melody score for all verses (as JPEGs or a PDF file) in English and Esperanto: "The Twelve Days of Christmas / La Dek Du Tagoj de Kristnasko"

British Christmas songs
Christmas carols
Cumulative songs
Christmas in England
12 (number)